Berta Naumovna Borodkina (née Korol; 1927–1985) was a Soviet businessperson. She was the head of trust and restaurants and canteens in Gelendzhik, honored worker of trade and public catering of the RSFSR. Borodkina had the nickname Iron Bella.

She was the second of the three women executed in Soviet Union in the period from 1960 to 1987. She was sentenced to death for systematic theft of socialist property.

Biography 
Borodkina began working in the field of trade with the posts of barmaid and waitress, and was subsequently appointed to the position of director of canteen in the Gelendzhik trust of restaurants and canteens headed in 1974. She was arrested in 1982. According to the version of investigative authorities, in the period from 1974 to 1982, she was engaged in speculation in especially large sizes.

During the search, Borodkina found many valuable things, as well as large amounts of money. According to Anton Lopatin, senior assistant to the prosecutor of the Krasnodar Territory for media relations, resident's housing resembled museum stores, which contained numerous precious jewelry, furs, crystal products, and bedding sets that were in short supply at that time. In addition, according to the testimony of the prosecutor's office of the Krasnodar Territory, Honored Lawyer of the RSFSR Vladimir Nagorny, she kept large sums of money at home, which the investigators found in the most unexpected places – in radiators and under the carpets in the rooms, rolled up banks in the basement, in the warehouses backyard bricks. The total amount seized during the search amounted to more than 500,000 roubles.

It is believed that in total during her activities she received from partners in goods and cash worth more than a million roubles. In 1982, she was sentenced to death. The sentence was carried out in 1985 in Novocherkassk Prison.

References

1927 births
1985 deaths
Executed Russian women
Soviet criminals
People executed by the Soviet Union by firearm
People convicted of bribery in Russia
People convicted of embezzlement
People from Bila Tserkva
Ukrainian Soviet Socialist Republic people
Soviet businesswomen
People executed for corruption